Ana Ligia Mixco Sol de Saca (born December 1, 1961) is a Salvadoran businesswoman who served as the First Lady of El Salvador from 2004 to 2009. She is the wife of former President Antonio Saca.

Mixco, the daughter of Ana María Sol de Mixco and José Mauricio Mixco Orellana, was born on December 1, 1961, in Santa Tecla, La Libertad Department, El Salvador. She attended  Colegio Fátima for elementary school before studying at Centro Berkely. In 1982, she represented La Libertad Department as a contestant in the Miss El Salvador pageant.

She first met Antonio Saca on January 11, 1988. The couple married on August 11, 1989, and had three children, Gerardo Antonio, Jose Alejandro and Christian Eduardo. In 1993, she and her husband co-founded SAMIX Group, a media company, with Mixco serving as SAMIX's vice president.

In 2006, First Lady Ana Ligia Mixco de Saca served as the honorary chairperson of the organizing committee for Special Olympics' Latin American Games, which took place in San Salvador from March 28 to April 2, 2006. This marked the first time that the Special Olympics had held in Latin America.

On January 5, 2021, both Ana Ligia de Saca and her husband, who was already serving a 10 year prison sentence after pleading guilty in September 2018 to separate corruption charged, were found guilty of illicit enrichment and were ordered to repay the El Salvador government $4.4 million On June 4, 2021, Ana Ligia de Saca and her brother Oscar Edgardo Sol Mixco would be sentenced to 10 years in prison money laundering Friday and was ordered to repay $17.6 million to the El Salvador government.

References

1961 births
Living people
People from La Libertad Department (El Salvador)
First ladies of El Salvador
Salvadoran business executives
Salvadoran women in business
21st-century Salvadoran women politicians
21st-century Salvadoran politicians
Sol family